This is a list of launches made by the Zenit rocket. All launches were conducted from either Site 45 of the Baikonur Cosmodrome or from Sea Launch's Ocean Odyssey offshore launch platform.

Launch statistics 
Rockets from the Zenit family have accumulated 84 launches since 1985, 71 of which were successful, yielding a  success rate.

Rocket configuration

Launch sites

Launch outcomes

Launch history

References

Zenit